Casciano is a village in Tuscany, central Italy, administratively a frazione of the comune of Murlo, province of Siena. At the time of the 2001 census its population was 678.

References 

Frazioni of Murlo